Naka Laxmaya (2 December 1950 – 16 January 2020) was an Indian politician from Odisha belonging to Indian National Congress. He was a legislator of the Odisha Legislative Assembly.

Biography
Laxmaya was  born on 2 December 1950. He was elected as a member of the Odisha Legislative Assembly from Malkangiri in 1980.

Laxmaya died on 16 January 2020 at the age of 69.

References

1950 births
2020 deaths
Odisha MLAs 1980–1985
Indian National Congress politicians from Odisha